The largest infrared telescopes for infrared astronomy are listed in terms of diameter of primary mirror. The infrared spectrum with its longer wavelength than visible light has a number of challenges, especially for ground-based observatories but also in space. Notably infrared radiation is emitted by all physical objects above Absolute Zero temperature so telescopes are subject to local interference.

Overall

Infrared observations from Earth's surface are possible in a limited way but can be very dependent on location and atmospheric conditions. Water vapour in the Earth's atmosphere blocks much of the infrared band, although some limited observations are possible and there is a number of infrared observatories.

Sometimes other optical telescopes can make infrared observations if they are equipped with the right detectors, even if they are not dedicated infrared observatories. For ground-based observatories, the location can make a big difference in how much observation is possible.

Space telescopes only

 For comparison

See also
 Lists of telescopes
 Infrared telescope
 List of largest optical reflecting telescopes
 Space Flyer Unit
 Diffuse Infrared Background Experiment (all-sky infrared observation on COBE, launched 1989)

References

Lists of telescopes

Telescopes